The Kiss is a 2007 Japanese crime drama film directed by Kunitoshi Manda, starring Eiko Koike, Etsushi Toyokawa and Toru Nakamura.

Plot
Kyoko Endo (Eiko Koike), a young and lonely female office worker, falls in love with Akio Sakaguchi (Etsushi Toyokawa), a man in prison for killing a whole family, at first sight when she watches a television news program telling about him. But Hasegawa (Toru Nakamura), his lawyer, worries about their relationship.

Cast
 Eiko Koike as Kyoko Endo
 Etsushi Toyokawa as Akio Sakaguchi
 Toru Nakamura as Hasegawa

Release
The 9th Jeonju International Film Festival opened with the world premiere of The Kiss in May 2008.

Reception
Lee Hyo-won of The Korea Times said, "The film traces delicate human relationships and all its melodrama, all the while expressing ― or suppressing ― emotions with restraint." Japanese film critic Inuhiko Yomota said, "I think it's a fantastic film." The film was listed by the Film Comment magazine as their "18 Films to Look Out For" in 2008 and Japanese film critic Shigehiko Hasumi said, "The ending is astonishing and all three actors are excellent, in particular Eiko Koike, who plays the young woman."

References

External links
 

Japanese crime drama films
2007 films
2007 crime drama films
2000s Japanese films